The 2017 Fótbolti.net Cup is the 7th season of Iceland's annual pre-season tournament. The tournament involves eight clubs from the top two leagues in Iceland, Úrvalsdeild and 1. deild, and uses a combination of group and knockout rounds to determine each team's final position in the competition. The tournament began on 10 January 2017 and concluded on 5 February 2017.

ÍBV are the defending champions, having defeated KR 2–1 in the previous year's final on 1 February 2016.

Groups

Group A

Matches

Group B

Matches

Knockout phase

Seventh place

Fifth place

Third place

Final

References

External links
 Group A results at KSI
 Group B results at KSI
 Knockout round results at KSI
 Results at Futbol24.com
 Results at Soccerway

Fotbolti